Rushbrooke Hall was a British stately home in Rushbrooke, Suffolk. For several hundred years it was the family seat of the Jermyn family. It was demolished in 1961.

The original manor house on the moated site to the south of the village of Rushbrooke is believed to have been constructed in the reign of King John. Originally named after the local landowning Rushbrooke family, between 1230 and 1703 the manor and estate was held by the Jermyn family. The older manor was largely demolished and remodeled in the mid-16th century by Sir Thomas Jermyn, to be replaced by a red brick, two storey building in the Tudor style. The new stately home was completed in about 1550, and was laid out in an E-shaped plan. It was constructed around a courtyard, about 30m square with the main range of the house running along the north side of the moat and two long projecting wings along the east and west sides. There were polygonal turrets, each three stories high, at the four corners of the wings. The entrance to the house was through an impressive central porch built of Barnack stone and decorated with armorial achievements. Major modernising alterations were made to the house in about 1735.

The moated stately home was at the centre of a large ornamental garden and a parkland estate. An ornamental canal, 114 metres long, has since been infilled. The Jermyn family exercised considerable influence in Suffolk and Elizabeth I is recorded as having stayed at the house in 1578 and on at least one other occasion. The estate remained in the Jermyn family until the early 18th century, when it passed by marriage to Sir Robert Davers, 2nd Baronet. The Davers family held it until the death of Sir Charles Davers, 6th Baronet in 1806. It passed to Frederick Hervey, 1st Marquess of Bristol, who sold the house to Robert Rushbrooke, whose family owned the house until 1919. In 1938 ownership of the manor was taken over by the Rothschild family. In 1961 it was decided to demolish the house; shortly afterwards a fire devastated the building. Several of the remaining decorative features were used in St Edmund's Church, Bury St Edmunds. The moated site and some of the formal gardens are all that remain of the house.

References

Country houses in Suffolk
Former country houses in England
British country houses destroyed in the 20th century
Jermyn family
Rothschild family residences